Iron Horse is a 1983 board game published by Icarus Games.

Gameplay
Iron Horse is a family game for two to eight people which represents an era in history when much of the vast railroad network in the United States was divided into great continent-spanning systems.

Reception
Creede Lambard reviewed Iron Horse in Space Gamer No. 69. Lambard commented that "I recommend the game, but those of us who prefer a more challenging railroad simulation should stick to Rail Baron or Empire Builder (or HO layouts). Anyone who comes to play without thoroughly washing and drying his hands should be tied up and left on the track in front of a speeding freight train."

References

Board games introduced in 1983